Empress Shen may refer to 2 empresses of the Chen dynasty:

Shen Miaorong ( 546–605), married to Chen Qian (Emperor Wen)
Shen Wuhua ( 569–626), married to Chen Shubao

Shen